Act of Providence is a supernatural detective novella by Joseph Payne Brennan and Donald M. Grant. It was first published in 1979 by Donald M. Grant, Publisher, Inc. in an edition of 1,450 copies of which 350 were signed by the authors and the artist.

Plot introduction
The novella features Brennan's supernatural detective Lucius Leffing and is set during the first World Fantasy Convention in Providence, Rhode Island in 1975.

References

1979 American novels
American mystery novels
American horror novels
Novels set in Providence, Rhode Island
Fiction set in 1975
Donald M. Grant, Publisher books